This article is about music-related events in 1839.

Events
March 21 – Felix Mendelssohn conducts the first known performance of Franz Schubert's Great C Major Symphony
November 17 – Giuseppe Verdi's first opera, Oberto, Conte di San Bonifacio, opens at La Scala, Milan.

Classical music
Hector Berlioz – Romeo et Juliette
Frédéric Chopin 
Ballade No. 2
Scherzo No. 3
Piano Sonata No. 2
Mikhail Glinka 
La séparation
Polonaise
Valse-Fantasie
Johann Nepomuk Hummel – 2 Preludes and Fugue for Organ (published posthumously)
Joseph Lanner – Amazonen-Galopp; Malapou Galop
Franz Liszt 
Valse mélancolique, S.210
Angiolin dal biondo crin, S.269
Fantaisie sur des motifs favoris de l'opéra 'La sonnambula', S.393
Felix Mendelssohn 
6 Gesänge, Op. 47
Piano Trio No. 1 in D Minor, Op. 49
"Liebe und Wein"
Robert Schumann:
Arabesque in C, Op. 18
Blumenstück (Flower Piece) in D, Op. 19
Humoreske in B, Op. 20
4 Nachtstücke (Night Pieces), Op. 23
Faschingsschwank aus Wien, Op. 26
3 Romances, Op. 28 (B minor, F, B)
Louis Spohr – Concerto for Violin no 14 in A minor, Op. 110 "Sonst und Jetzt"

Opera
Alexander Dargomyzhsky – Esmeralda
Gaetano Donizetti 
L'Ange de Nisida
Il duca d'Alba (composed, premiered 1882)
Giuseppe Lillo – Il conte di Chalais
Giuseppe Verdi – Oberto, Conte di San Bonifacio

Published popular music
 "Kathleen Mavourneen" w. Annie Barry Crawford m. Frederick William Nicholls Crouch

Births
January 1 – James Ryder Randall, popular songwriter
January 9 – John Knowles Paine, composer and musicologist
February 7 – Elie Miriam Delaborde, editor and pianist (died 1913)
April 18 –  Lotten Edholm, composer
March 2 – Victoria Bundsen, alto
March 10 – Dudley Buck, American composer and organist
March 17 – Josef Rheinberger, composer (d. 1901)
March 19 – Gustav Roguski, composer and teacher of Mieczysław Karłowicz
March 21 – Modest Mussorgsky, composer (d. 1881)
April 12 – Victorin de Joncières, composer and music critic (d. 1903)
May 19 – Alice Mary Smith, composer (d. 1884)
July 14 – Sydney Smith, English composer and pianist
August 24 – Eduard Nápravník, composer (d. 1916)
November 24 – James Warren York, businessman, musical instrument maker

Deaths
February 16 – Ludwig Berger, pianist, composer and music teacher (b. 1777)
March 8 – Adolphe Nourrit, operatic tenor (b. 1802) (suicide)
April 20 – Giuseppe Rossini, father of the composer Gioacchino Rossini
May 3 – Ferdinando Paer, composer (b. 1771)
June 8 – Aloysia Weber, operatic soprano (b. c. 1760)
June 11 – Regina Strinasacchi, violinist (b. c. 1761)
June 14 – Nicolas Mori, violinist, conductor and music publisher (b. 1796)
June 15 – Hans Skramstad, pianist and composer (b. 1797)
July 10 – Fernando Sor, guitarist and composer (b. 1778)
September 21 – Gottfried Weber, music theorist (b. 1779)
December 7 – Jan August Vitásek, composer (b. 1770)

Awards
Prix de Rome – Charles Gounod

 
19th century in music
Music by year